Kacie Cryer is an American college basketball coach, currently serving as an assistant coach for the Houston Baptist Huskies women's basketball team.

Cryer was formerly the head coach of McNeese State women's basketball team from 2016 to 2021. Before being named head coach, Cryer served for eight seasons on Donald-Williams's staff at McNeese State as an assistant, helping lead the program to two NCAA tournament appearances. She earned a bachelor's degree in general studies from Louisiana State University in Shreveport in 2008 and her master's degree in instructional technology from McNeese State in 2012.

Coaching career

McNeese State
On April 8, 2016, Cryer was announced as the new head coach of the McNeese State women's basketball program. 

On March 12, 2021, Cryer's contract was not renewed by McNeese State after leading the Cowboys to a sixth straight losing season.

Houston Baptist
On August 2, 2021, Cryer was named an assistant coach for the Houston Baptist Huskies women's basketball team.

Head coaching record

College

References

Living people
Year of birth missing (living people)
Louisiana State University Shreveport alumni
American women's basketball coaches
American women's basketball players
Basketball coaches from Louisiana
Basketball players from Louisiana
People from Abbeville, Louisiana
21st-century American women